Philipp Malicsek (born 3 June 1997) is an Austrian footballer who plays for Vorwärts Steyr. His brother Lukas and his cousin Manuel Maranda are footballer.

International career
He represented Austria at the 2016 UEFA European Under-19 Championship, where they were eliminated at group stage.

References

External links
Philipp Malicsek at ÖFB

1997 births
Footballers from Vienna
Austrian people of Hungarian descent
Living people
Austrian footballers
Association football midfielders
Austria youth international footballers
Austria under-21 international footballers
FC Admira Wacker Mödling players
SK Rapid Wien players
SKN St. Pölten players
Floridsdorfer AC players
FC Blau-Weiß Linz players
SK Vorwärts Steyr players
Austrian Football Bundesliga players
2. Liga (Austria) players